Fun Radio Belgique is a private Belgian radio station, broadcasting in Wallonia and Brussels.

History

In 1989, Benoît Sillard is designated by Robert Hersant to become CEO of Fun Radio. Sillard decides to boost the radio notably by the developing the station abroad. After Fun Radio Romania, Fun Radio Poland and Fun Radio Slovakia, Fun Radio Belgium was created.

Frequencies

See also
 Fun Radio, the French version.
 Fun Radio Slovakia, the Slovak version.

French-language radio stations in Belgium
Radio stations established in 1989